Isos or ISOS may refer to:
 Isos (Boeotia), a town of ancient Boeotia, Greece
 Isos (Megaris), a town of ancient Megaris, Greece
 Isos Sinasos, a Greek dance
 In Search of Sunrise (series), a trance/house mix-compilation music CD series by Tiësto
 Integrated School of Ocean Sciences, a post-graduate school for marine scientists in Kiel, Germany
 Inventory of Swiss Heritage Sites, part of a 1981 Ordinance of the Swiss Federal Council implementing the Federal Law on the Protection of Nature and Cultural Heritage

See also
ISO (disambiguation)
Issos (disambiguation)